Drama on the Tiber (Italian: Dramma sul Tevere) is a 1952 Italian drama film directed by Tanio Boccia and starring Renato Baldini, Aldo Fiorelli and Bianca Doria. The plot centres around a widow named Sora Rosa with two sons, Aldo and Bruno. While Aldo lives an upright life, Bruno is part of the entourage of a dangerous gangster named Barone Toto.

Plot 
Rome, A poor widow Sora Rosa raised Aldo and Bruno alone. The two brothers grew up in different ways, the first Aldo lives a respectable life and the second Bruno has become a criminal in the pay of the Roman underworld boss Totò known as Er Barone.

Cast
 Renato Baldini as Bruno Rossi
 Aldo Fiorelli as Aldo Rossi
 Bianca Doria as La sora Rosa, loro madre
 Zina Rachevsky as La soubrette Mughetto
 Silvana Muzi as Nunziatina
 Cesare Fantoni as Toto, detto 'barone'
 Alberto Sorrentino as Il saputello

References

External links
 

1952 films
1950s Italian-language films
Films directed by Tanio Boccia
Italian drama films
1952 drama films
Italian black-and-white films
1950s Italian films
Films set in Rome